The 2015 Royal Rumble was the 28th annual Royal Rumble professional wrestling pay-per-view and livestreaming event produced by WWE. It took place on January 25, 2015, at the Wells Fargo Center in Philadelphia, Pennsylvania, and was the first Royal Rumble to air on the WWE Network, which launched in February 2014. As has been customary since 1993, the Royal Rumble match winner received a world championship match at that year's WrestleMania. For the 2015 event, the winner received a match for the WWE World Heavyweight Championship at WrestleMania 31.

Six matches were contested at the event, with one match on the Kickoff pre-show. In the main event, Roman Reigns won the 2015 Royal Rumble match by last eliminating Rusev. Also on the event's card, The Usos (Jey Uso and Jimmy Uso) defeated The Miz and Damien Mizdow to retain the WWE Tag Team Championship, while WWE World Heavyweight Champion Brock Lesnar successfully defended his title against Seth Rollins and John Cena in a triple threat match in the penultimate match.

Like the previous year's event, the 2015 Royal Rumble was marked by a strongly negative audience reaction to the Royal Rumble match, which was won by Roman Reigns. The event as a whole, however, received mixed reviews, with the WWE World Heavyweight Championship triple threat match receiving the most praise from critics and fans. The event received 145,000 buys (excluding WWE Network views), down from the previous year's 467,000 buys.

Production

Background
The Royal Rumble is an annual gimmick pay-per-view (PPV), produced every January by WWE since 1988. It is one of the promotion's original four pay-per-views, along with WrestleMania, SummerSlam, and Survivor Series, dubbed the "Big Four". It is named after the Royal Rumble match, a modified battle royal in which the participants enter at timed intervals instead of all beginning in the ring at the same time. The match generally features 30 wrestlers and the winner traditionally earns a world championship match at that year's WrestleMania. For 2015, the winner received a match for the WWE World Heavyweight Championship at WrestleMania 31. The 2015 event was the 28th event in the Royal Rumble chronology and was scheduled to be held on January 25, 2015, at the Wells Fargo Center in Philadelphia, Pennsylvania. In addition to airing on traditional PPV, the event was available through WWE's online streaming service, the WWE Network, which launched in February 2014, which made it the first Royal Rumble to air on the WWE Network.

Storylines
The card consisted of six matches, including one on the Kickoff pre-show. The matches resulted from scripted storylines, where wrestlers portrayed heroes, villains, or less distinguishable characters in scripted events that built tension and culminated in a wrestling match or series of matches, with results predetermined by WWE's writers, with storylines produced on their weekly television shows, Raw and SmackDown.

At SummerSlam, Brock Lesnar defeated John Cena to win the WWE World Heavyweight Championship. Cena would receive his rematch the following month at Night of Champions which he would win by disqualification after Seth Rollins interfered and attempted to cash-in his Money in the Bank contract. At the next event, Hell in a Cell, Cena defeated Authority member Randy Orton in a Hell in a Cell match to earn a future title shot at Lesnar. The Authority was then removed from power after losing the 5-on-5 Survivor Series elimination match at Survivor Series with Cena being the only one who could bring them back if he chose to. At TLC: Tables, Ladders and Chairs, Cena faced Rollins in a Tables match which he won to retain his #1 contender status. Later in the event, it was announced that Cena would face Lesnar for the title at the Royal Rumble. On the final Raw of 2014, Rollins attacked special guest host Edge and threatened to perform a Curb Stomp on him if Cena did not reinstate The Authority. Cena came down to save Edge but reluctantly brought The Authority back after Rollins held Edge hostage. On the January 5, 2015 episode of Raw, Rollins was added to the Lesnar-Cena title match by Triple H as a reward for bringing back The Authority, turning the singles match into a Triple Threat. That same episode, the members of Team Cena from Survivor Series (Dolph Ziggler, Ryback and Erick Rowan) were fired by The Authority for helping Cena to remove them from power. The following week, Lesnar returned for the contract signing with Cena and Rollins. A brawl broke out between all three men and ended when Rollins performed a Curb Stomp each on Cena and Lesnar. On the final Raw before the Royal Rumble, Triple H forced Cena to compete in a 3-on-1 Handicap match against Rollins, Big Show and Kane  to not only secure his spot in the Triple Threat match, but also win Ziggler, Ryback and Rowan their jobs back. During the match, Sting, who previously assisted Team Cena at Survivor Series, caused a distraction which allowed Cena to roll-up Rollins for the win to keep his spot in the match and reinstate Ziggler, Ryback and Rowan. Lesnar then came down to the ring and attacked Rollins before executing an  F-5 each on Kane and Big Show. Rollins then retreated to avoid further punishment.

On the December 29 episode of Raw, The Usos defeated The Miz and Damien Mizdow to win the WWE Tag Team Championship. On the January 15 episode of SmackDown, it was announced that the Usos would defend the titles against Miz and Mizdow at the event.

On the January 5 episode of Raw, Paige came out and helped Natalya to defeat Nikki Bella. On the January 6 episode of Main Event, Natalya came out and helped Paige to defeat Nikki Bella. On the January 12 episode of Raw, Brie Bella defeated Paige due to distraction by Tyson Kidd.  On the January 15 episode of SmackDown, Natalya defeated Nikki via submission. On the January 19 edition of Raw, after Paige and Natalya defeated Summer Rae and Alicia Fox, it was announced that The Bella Twins (Brie and Nikki) would face Paige and Natalya in a tag team match at the event.

On the January 5 episode of Raw, Cesaro and Tyson Kidd attacked Kofi Kingston and Xavier Woods, which let Adam Rose to defeat Big E. On the January 19, episode of Raw, Big E and Kofi defeated Cesaro and Kidd. Later in the night, it was announced that The New Day would face Cesaro, Kidd and Rose in a Six-man tag team elimination match on the Royal Rumble Kickoff Show. On January 25, it was changed to a tag team match with Cesaro and Kidd accompanied by Rose versus Big E and Kingston with Woods due to Woods being unable to compete.

On the December 29 episode of Raw, The Ascension (Konnor and Viktor) made their WWE debut. Over the next few weeks, the duo would easily defeat local preliminary wrestlers and compare themselves to famous tag teams, like The Road Warriors. On the January 19 episode of Raw, the Ascension were confronted and attacked by the New World Order, the APA and New Age Outlaws (Billy Gunn and Road Dogg) after the Ascension interfered in the nWo reunion segment. Later in the night, it was announced that the Ascension would face the New Age Outlaws at the event.

Event

Pre-show
During the Royal Rumble Kickoff pre-show, Cesaro and Tyson Kidd faced The New Day (Big E and Kofi Kingston). Kingston and Big E were in control for most of the match until Cesaro executed a European uppercut on Kingston (from the outside) and Kidd executed a fisherman's neckbreaker on Kingston to secure a decisive victory.

Preliminary matches 
The actual pay-per-view opened with The Ascension (Konnor and Viktor) facing The New Age Outlaws (Road Dogg and Billy Gunn). The Ascension had control for the majority of the match, however, Gunn came back with a tilt-a-whirl slam and positioned Viktor for the "Famouser". Viktor made a blind tag to Konnor and executed the "Fall of Man" on Gunn for the win.

Next was the WWE Tag Team Championship match between The Miz and Damien Mizdow and The Usos. During the match, The Miz refused to tag Mizdow into the match, but Mizdow made a few saves. Miz executed a "Skull Crushing Finale" on Jey for a near-fall. Mizdow did the same to Jey but earned a near-fall again. The Usos won the match with a "Samoan Splash" on Miz.

After that, The Bella Twins (Brie Bella and Divas Champion Nikki Bella) faced Paige and Natalya. Nikki executed a forearm smash on Natalya for the victory.

In the fourth match, Brock Lesnar accompanied by his advocate Paul Heyman, John Cena and Seth Rollins fought in a Triple Threat match for the WWE World Heavyweight Championship. Lesnar dominated the match early with multiple Suplexes on both Cena and Rollins. Lesnar then applied the Kimura Lock on Cena, but Rollins broke it up. Cena executed an Attitude Adjustment on Lesnar, but Rollins threw Cena out of the ring to steal a pin attempt, but Lesnar kicked out at one. Lesnar caught Rollins and executed an F-5 on him, but Cena broke up the pin. Cena executed three more Attitude Adjustments on Lesnar, but Rollins broke up the pin. Rollins then executed a Curb Stomp on Lesnar, but Cena broke up the pin. Cena tackled Lesnar through the barricade in the timekeeper's area, threw him to the steel steps, hit him with the same steel steps putting him on an announce table and Rollins finished the combo with a Diving Elbow Drop on him through it. Doctors came from backstage to check on and eventually attempt to stretcher out Lesnar. Cena eventually locked in the STF on Rollins, but J&J Security (Jamie Noble and Joey Mercury) interfered resulting in Cena executing a Double Attitude Adjustment on Mercury and Noble. Cena then executed an Attitude Adjustment on Rollins and Rollins a Curb Stomp Cena with both for near-falls. An angry Lesnar returned to the ring, took down both men and threw Cena out of the ring. Rollins hit Lesnar twice with his Money in the Bank briefcase and positioned the briefcase under Lesnar's head. As Rollins attempted a second Curb Stomp to Lesnar, he countered with a second F-5 on Rollins to retain the title by pinfall.

Main event 
The main event was the traditional 30-man Royal Rumble match where the winner would receive a WWE World Heavyweight Championship match at WrestleMania 31. The Miz and R-Truth started the match at #1 and #2 respectively. Bubba Ray Dudley made his return to WWE at #3 eliminating Miz and Truth. Bray Wyatt at #5 would soon begin a string of eliminations one by one (including Bubba and The Boogeyman who was another surprise entrant at #7). The string ended once Daniel Bryan entered at #10. During the string, Curtis Axel who was supposed to enter at #6 was attacked by Erick Rowan who took his place.

Diamond Dallas Page was the third surprise entrant at #14 and executed the Diamond Cutter on various wrestlers before being eliminated by #15 entrant U.S. Champion Rusev. Like in 2014, the rumble reception entered again to a turning point for worse when Wyatt eliminated Bryan (the biggest fan-favorite) enraging almost all the audience even more than previous year due to his absence. Towards the end of the match, Kane at #24 and Big Show at #29 from The Authority teamed up to go on a string of eliminations (including other fan-favorites like Ryback at #23, Dolph Ziggler at final #30, Wyatt and Dean Ambrose at #25).

The Final Four consisted of Rusev (who was outside the ring at the time having gone under the bottom rope), Roman Reigns at #19, Kane and Show. Reigns (who during the match suffered a cut from Show on one cheek after being thrown to a padded turnbuckle and another one from Kane on the lips after a Big Boot) eliminated the duo at the same time. However, they both re-entered the ring and began a double team assault on Reigns. The Rock emerged and executed an Spinebuster-People's Elbow combo on Kane and a Rock Bottom on Show after a Superman Punch from Reigns who took advantage of a low-blow from Rock. Rusev re-entered the ring, but was speared by Reigns who eliminated him to win the match. Triple H and Stephanie McMahon showed up at the end of the show unhappy with the result as Rock congratulated Reigns.

Reception 

The very negative reaction of the fans attending the event in Philadelphia towards the Royal Rumble match and its winner was described as being even worse than the 2014 event. When Daniel Bryan was eliminated in the first half of the match, the crowd repeatedly chanted his name for the second half of the match while booing other wrestlers making their entrance to the match, including eventual winner Roman Reigns. The crowd grew even more unhappy when fan favorites Dolph Ziggler and Dean Ambrose were eliminated, and chanted for the anti-American villain Rusev when the main event came down to Rusev and Reigns, as well as chants of "bullshit" and "CM Punk". Reigns was booed after winning the main event, even after he received The Rock's endorsement, and The Rock was heckled for helping Reigns. Many fans took to social media to display their displeasure at Bryan's elimination.

Dave Scherer of PWInsider.com wrote that the event "is definitely worth watching for the WWE World Heavyweight Championship triple threat match and how the Rumble went bad". He added that "bringing Bryan back for this match was a huge mistake, at least tonight", as "the fans wanted Bryan and they took him away", with the result that it "totally killed Roman in the eyes of those fans", resulting in a "really bad" ending.

James Caldwell of Pro Wrestling Torch newsletter rated the Royal Rumble main event as 3.5 stars out of 5, commenting that it was a "pretty good Rumble" until "the crowd turned on the match when they saw the writing on the wall for how it would end". Caldwell praised Bray Wyatt's involvement in the match and noted that Bubba Ray Dudley was a "good surprise return", but added that any good moments during the match were "overshadowed by the ending". Caldwell rated the WWE World Heavyweight Championship match as 4.0 out of 5 stars, praising the "very strong story-telling" and describing the action as "top-notch" but adding that the match was "too dependent on the finisher kick-outs". He rated the Tag Team Championship match at 2.5 stars, describing it as a "solid tag match", while the Divas match and the opening bout between The Ascension and The New Age Outlaws were both rated at 1.5 stars out of 5.

Kenny Herzog of Rolling Stone questioned the possibility of the Royal Rumble match being the worst in history, arguing that several factors such as the poor treatment of former Intercontinental champions, Daniel Bryan's unexpected early elimination and Kane and Big Show's dominance over younger talent all detracted from the match. Herzog concluded, "That was less a Rumble match – i.e. the kind replete with feats of endurance and athleticism, free-for-all chaos and dozens of developing stories – than random gauntlet of triple-threat and four-way slugfests with no pacing or point. Unless, that is, you still think serving some idea of the Authority's omnipresence is really what's best for business." Despite this, Herzog praised the lively Philadelphia crowd, the return of Bubba Ray Dudley and Rollins' performance in the WWE World Heavyweight Championship match as positives.

Luke Winkie of Sports Illustrated was less critical of the Royal Rumble match, attributing Bryan's elimination to good storytelling and an instance where "you're supposed to hate the product". Winkie suggested that the "tepid reaction to [Reigns'] win has much more to do with Daniel Bryan’s early departure than it does with [Reigns'] actual reputation". Winkie singled out Ziggler's late entrance and elimination as "the most heartbreaking". He also praised the WWE World Heavyweight Championship match as being an early "Match of the Year" candidate, while questioning whether anyone cared about the Ascension.

WWE Hall of Famer Mick Foley, who had been critical of the previous year's show, wrote that he was saddened by the prospect of the Royal Rumble losing its luster and relevance as an annual event, and that he now considers it to be "a roadblock to the good will and excitement needed for a truly memorable WrestleMania atmosphere." Foley took aim at WWE for the supposedly unimaginative and unflattering use of fan favorites in the main Royal Rumble match, and, based on his observations of fans as they exited the arena, said "there was no joy in Philadelphia".

Aftermath 
Shortly after the event, #CancelWWENetwork became the top Twitter trend worldwide, while PWInsider.com reported that the WWE Network online cancellation page had crashed and that some subscribers who had called WWE to cancel their subscription were told to call back the next day as there were too many people attempting to manually cancel their subscription. The day after the Royal Rumble, Dave Meltzer reported on Wrestling Observer Radio that Vince McMahon and WWE had expected that Reigns's victory would receive some backlash, but not to the level they had experienced, and that despite this, WWE would not add Daniel Bryan to the main event at WrestleMania 31, since Vince felt that "it would be a repeat and gone to the well one time too often". Two days after the Royal Rumble event, WWE announced that the WWE Network surpassed 1 million subscribers worldwide, but the Pro Wrestling Torch newsletter reported that the recent "upset subscribers canceling" had yet to be factored into the subscriber count. Four days after the Royal Rumble, WWE announced a new promotion for the WWE Network where new subscribers could watch for free for the month of February. In February 2015, WWE held a poll on WWE.com asking if fans thought Bryan or Reigns was more deserving of headlining WrestleMania 31; following more than 33,000 votes, 86% of votes went to Bryan. Also in that month, WWE Chairman Vince McMahon responded to #CancelWWENetwork in a conference call, saying that the controversy was good for WWE. McMahon labelled it as a vocal minority upset that "the babyface did not win" and "Santa Claus didn't come on that PPV", but he expected those who complained to continue watching WWE anyway.

WWE had to postpone the post-Rumble Raw from Hartford, Connecticut due to the January 2015 nor'easter, marking the first time WWE had to cancel a scheduled Raw taping since the Chris Benoit double-murder and suicide and the first time Raw had to be moved to another city since 2009. WWE also canceled its scheduled SmackDown taping from Boston the following night. WWE decided to have Raw come from WWE headquarters in nearby Stamford, Connecticut instead, announcing it would hold a live SmackDown on Thursday from Hartford, honoring tickets that would be used for Raw, while allowing fans in Boston to either exchange their tickets for an upcoming house show on June 27 or obtaining a full refund. The post-Rumble Raw showed the WWE World Heavyweight Championship match and the main event of the Royal Rumble, albeit with commercial breaks. Seth Rollins, Brock Lesnar, Paul Heyman, Roman Reigns, and Daniel Bryan did in-studio interviews with several WWE announcers, such as Michael Cole, Renee Young and Byron Saxton, while Dean Ambrose "walked" to WWE headquarters from Hartford due to the statewide 9 PM travel ban.

Although Curtis Axel being unable to participate in the Rumble match was not unprecedented, the fact that Axel was not eliminated (having never officially entered the match) ended up trended on Twitter following the event, and also received supportive tweets from former WWE wrestlers Lance Storm and Tommy Dreamer, and then later from current WWE wrestlers Xavier Woods, Zack Ryder, and David Otunga, the latter offering his legal services. This led to an angle where he began referring to himself as "the true winner" of the Royal Rumble, claiming that he still had not been eliminated from the match and that he thus deserved a match with Lesnar at WrestleMania 31 for the WWE World Heavyweight Championship. This also led to Axel starting his own hashtag (#AxelMania). Instead of facing Brock Lesnar, Axel participated in the second annual André the Giant Memorial Battle Royal at WrestleMania 31, but was the first wrestler eliminated after the majority of the field threw him out of the ring.

Results

Royal Rumble entrances and eliminations 
A new entrant came out approximately every 90 seconds.

 – Winner

 1 – Curtis Axel was the actual #6 entrant, but as a result of Erick Rowan attacking Axel before entering the ring, Erick Rowan took his spot. He has now been in the Rumble match for 2,932 days.

2 – Titus O'Neil was originally supposed to be eliminated in 0:01, but because of a mis-communication between Titus O'Neil, Dean Ambrose, and Roman Reigns the spot was botched resulting in Titus being eliminated in 0:04

References

External links 

Events in Philadelphia
2015
2015 WWE Network events
2015 in Pennsylvania
Professional wrestling in Philadelphia
2015 WWE pay-per-view events
January 2015 events in the United States